Earlville Airport  was a public use airport located two nautical miles (3.7 km) southwest of the central business district of Earlville, a city in LaSalle County, Illinois, United States.

Facilities and aircraft 
It had one runway designated 4/22 with a turf surface measuring 3,400 by 100 feet (1,036 x 30 m). For the 12-month period ending December 31, 2007, the airport had 2,000 general aviation aircraft operations, an average of 166 per month.

Google Earth aerial photography shows the airport closing sometime between October 2009 and August 2010.  The grass runway has been replaced by agricultural crops, though the former ramp remained visible in imagery from September 2015.

References

External links 
 Aerial photo as of 5 April 1998 from USGS The National Map

Defunct airports in Illinois
Transportation buildings and structures in LaSalle County, Illinois